Mejdi Kaabi ( 9 June 1961 - 28 June 2019) is a Tunisian chess player. He was awarded the title International Master by FIDE in 1982. 

Kaabi qualified for the Chess World Cup 2011, where he was defeated by Sergey Karjakin in the first round.

References

External links

Mejdi Kaabi chess games at 365Chess.com

1961 births
Living people
Tunisian chess players
Chess International Masters
20th-century Tunisian people